Brahima Bruno Koné (born 30 March 1995) is an Ivorian professional footballer who plays as a forward for Greek Super League 2 club Kallithea.

Career
On 14 October 2016, Kone was released by Ararat Yerevan without playing a game for the club.
In October 2017, Kone secured a visa for Greece, allowing him to complete his signing for Anagennisi Karditsa.

Career statistics

Club

Honours

Club 
Saint George:
 Ethiopian Premier League (1): 2016–17

References

External links
 

1995 births
Living people
Association football forwards
Ivorian footballers
Ivorian expatriate footballers
FC Mika players
FC Ararat Yerevan players
Anagennisi Karditsa F.C. players
Irodotos FC players
Armenian Premier League players
Expatriate footballers in Armenia
Expatriate footballers in Ethiopia
Expatriate footballers in Greece
Ivorian expatriate sportspeople in Armenia
Ivorian expatriate sportspeople in Ethiopia
Ivorian expatriate sportspeople in Greece